Travis Ott (born June 29, 1995) is an American professional baseball pitcher in the Tampa Bay Rays organization.

Career
Ott attended Shippensburg Area High School in Shippensburg, Pennsylvania, and played for the school's baseball team. As a senior, he set a school record with 112 strikeouts. The Washington Nationals selected Ott in the 25th round of the 2013 MLB draft.

Washington Nationals
Ott pitched for the Gulf Coast Nationals of the Rookie-level Gulf Coast League after he signed. He had a 3–0 win–loss record and a 4.03 earned run average (ERA) in 29 innings pitched. He began the 2014 season with the Auburn Doubledays of the Class A-Short Season New York–Penn League. After pitching to a 3.05 ERA with Auburn, the Nationals promoted him to the Hagerstown Suns of the Class A South Atlantic League.

Tampa Bay Rays
On December 19, 2014, the Nationals traded Ott and Steven Souza to the Tampa Bay Rays in a three-team trade, in which the San Diego Padres traded Joe Ross and a player to be named later (Trea Turner) to the Nationals, and the Padres traded Jake Bauers, Burch Smith, and René Rivera to the Rays, and the Padres got Wil Myers, Ryan Hanigan, and Jose Castillo from the Rays. Ott played for the Hudson Valley Renegades of the New York–Penn League in 2015, where the Rays worked with Ott to adapt a sidearm delivery. He remained with Hudson Valley in 2016, where he had a 6–0 record and a 1.21 ERA in 13 appearances. Ott spent 2017 with both the Bowling Green Hot Rods of the Class A Midwest League and the Charlotte Stone Crabs of the Class A-Advanced Florida State League, posting a combined 10–3 record with a 2.06 ERA in 27 games with 21 being starts. Ott began the 2018 season with the Montgomery Biscuits of the Class AA Southern League. In 44 appearances, Ott registered a 3.53 ERA with 91 strikeouts in 71.1 innings pitched. On April 3, 2019, Ott was placed on the restricted list and has not played in a professional game since.

References

External links

1995 births
Living people
People from Shippensburg, Pennsylvania
Baseball players from Pennsylvania
Baseball pitchers
Gulf Coast Nationals players
Auburn Doubledays players
Hagerstown Suns players
Hudson Valley Renegades players
Bowling Green Hot Rods players
Charlotte Stone Crabs players
Montgomery Biscuits players